Joel D. Finch (born August 20, 1956) is a former pitcher in Major League Baseball who played briefly for the Boston Red Sox during the  season. Listed at 6' 2", 175 lb., he batted and threw right-handed.

Finch posted a 0-3 record with 25 strikeouts, 25 walks and a 4.87 earned run average in 15 pitching appearances, including seven starts, five games finished, and 57⅓ innings of work.

External links

1956 births
Living people
Major League Baseball pitchers
Boston Red Sox players
Baseball players from South Bend, Indiana
Bristol Red Sox players
Elmira Pioneers players
Pawtucket Red Sox players
Winter Haven Red Sox players